Michael Dan Dejan (January 13, 1915 – February 2, 1953) was a professional baseball player.  He was an outfielder and pinch hitter for one season (1940) with the Cincinnati Reds.  For his career, he compiled a .188 batting average in 16 at-bats, with two runs batted in.

Personal life
Dejan served as a sergeant in the 705th Tank Destroyer Battalion during World War II and received the Bronze Star for service in Europe. He was wounded in the leg by shrapnel in April 1945.

References

1915 births
1953 deaths
Cincinnati Reds players
Major League Baseball catchers
Baseball players from Cleveland
Joplin Miners players
Norfolk Tars players
Wenatchee Chiefs players
Chattanooga Lookouts players
Birmingham Barons players
San Diego Padres (minor league) players
Tucson Cowboys players
United States Army personnel of World War II
United States Army soldiers